The Rwanda women's national under-18 basketball team is a national basketball team of Rwanda, administered by the Fédération Rwandaise de Basketball Amateur "FERWABA".
It represents the country in international women's under-18 (under age 18) basketball competitions.

The team took part in the qualification games to the 2014 FIBA Africa Under-18 Championship for Women.

See also
Rwanda women's national basketball team
Rwanda women's national under-16 basketball team
Rwanda men's national under-18 basketball team

References

External links
Archived records of Rwanda team participations

Rwanda women's national basketball team
Women's national under-18 basketball teams